Marc Cayce (born July 8, 1966) is an American film writer, director, and producer. His First film Nikita Blues was selected for the HBO Short Film Competition at the Acapulco Black Film Festival in Acapulco, Mexico.  Due to Nikita Blues receiving much fanfare and critical acclaim, Cayce was courted by some of Hollywood's biggest talent agencies such as William Morris. Cayce helped launch some of Hollywood's known stars such as Brandon T. Jackson, Essence Atkins, Kat Graham.

Early life 
Cayce was born on July 8, 1976, in Detroit, Michigan. His mother and father divorced when he was five years old.  Cayce attended Redford High School, a Detroit Public School, where as a senior he joined the Michigan Army National Guard as a Military Police Officer.  After high school, Cayce joined the Detroit Police Department as a Reserve Police Officer.

Growing up Cayce spent much of his time watching television and movies.  Watching movies such as Claudine and Cooley High greatly influenced his career choice.  After spending a short time in law enforcement, Cayce decided to pursue his dream of writing and directing and enrolled at the Los Angeles Film School.  While attending there, he met twin brothers Albert and Allen Hughes, better known as the Hughes Brothers.  The Hughes Brothers are twins and American film directors and producers, famously known for co-directing Menace II Society, Dead Presidents, From Hell and The Book of Eli. Cayce was encouraged to go to University of Southern California, School of Cinema Television.  Cayce emphasized his studies on screen writing.

After Cayce was fortunate to meet the acclaimed American film director, John Singleton, while pursuing his career, he decided to attend John's Alma mater University of Southern California (USC).  There he met and hired his composer, Stanley Clarke, for Cayce's first film titled Nikita Blues.

Career 
After graduating from USC Film School, Cayce took an internship as a production assistant at MPCA/Orion Picture in Santa Monica, CA.  After numerous long nights, ending with him sleeping at the production office many of those nights, he worked his way up to an independent producer slot with Motion Picture Corporation of America MPCA/Orion Pictures.

Cayce wrote a screenplay entitled A Chance Taken, for award-winning actress and iconic beauty Diahann Carroll.  Cayce was then awarded a Warner Brothers Records multi-picture soundtrack deal based on that screenplay. 

In 1999, Cayce wrote and produced a short film entitled Nikita Blues for HBO.  He was then asked to write a feature film version of the film, which was theatrically released in 2001.

In 2005, Cayce wrote and directed Forbidden Fruits produced by Foremost Entertainment / Universal Music Group. It was released in 2006. The film stars Fredro Starr, Tommy “Tiny” Lister, Keith Sweat, Keith David and Rima Fakih. This is an interracial love story between African Americans, Arab Americans and Chaldean Americans. When reviewed, it was called "a flawed movie, severely so in some parts [but] it managed to get us talking about certain things once we finished watching it because Cayce did infuse a lot of truthfully painful and difficult elements".

In 2008, Cayce third feature film, Trapped: Haitian Nights, was shot in Miami, Florida and in the country of Haiti.  It stars Vivica A. Fox and was released in the winter of 2010.

Cayce finished filming and released Detention Day in 2019.

He also completed a movie called A Day of Trouble, filmed in Nipsey Hussle's Marathon Clothing stores, about two cousins who are in rival gangs “Crips" and “Bloods”.

Cayce continued to build his catalog of feature films under his production company Foremost Entertainment. Flint Tale, examines the Flint Water Crisis that occurred in Flint, Michigan from April 2014 to 2019. Cayce, as a Michigan resident, was keen to tell the story of the people of Flint and those affected by the contaminated water there. The film stars Hawthorne James and Erica Peeples.

Cayce has also completed filming and is now in the process of releasing Sasha Lanes, starring Paula Jai Parker.

Filmography

External links
Forbidden Fruits, July 25, 2006
A Day of Trouble

References 

Living people
1978 births
Writers from Detroit
American directors
American producers
Redford High School alumni
University of Southern California alumni